Ludwig Heinrich Bojanus (16 July 1776 – 2 April 1827) was a German physician and naturalist who spent most of his active career teaching at Vilnius University in Tsarist Russia.

Bojanus was born at Bouxwiller in Alsace, finished his secondary education in Darmstadt and studied medicine at the University of Jena (Dr.med., 1797). In 1804 he was appointed professor of veterinary medicine at the University of Vilnius, a post which he could assume only in 1806, adding comparative anatomy to his offerings in 1814. In 1822 he was appointed rector of the university. Two years later, he returned to Darmstadt, where he died on 2 April 1827.

He produced an important and wonderfully illustrated work on the anatomy of turtles, Anatome Testudinis Europaeae. He was the author of several scientific discoveries, including a glandular organ in bivalvular molluscs that is now known as the organ of Bojanus. Also, he provided anatomical distinctions for the aurochs (Bos primigenius) and the steppe wisent (Bison priscus), being the binomial author of both species.

In 1814 he was elected corresponding member of the Imperial Academy of Sciences in St.Petersburg; in 1818 he became a member of the Imperial Leopold-Caroline Academy of Natural Sciences then in Bonn, and in 1821 was a foreign member of the Royal Swedish Academy of Sciences.

References

External links

1776 births
1827 deaths
University of Jena alumni
Rectors of Vilnius University
19th-century German zoologists
Members of the Royal Swedish Academy of Sciences
Corresponding members of the Saint Petersburg Academy of Sciences
Members of the German Academy of Sciences Leopoldina
19th-century German physicians
18th-century German zoologists